The Summit at Snoqualmie is a recreation area in the northwest United States, located on Snoqualmie Pass, Washington. It provides alpine skiing and snowboarding, Nordic skiing, mountain biking, winter tubing, and scenic lift rides.

The Summit consists of four base areas that used to be individually owned and operated resorts. Alpental, Summit West (formerly Snoqualmie Summit), Summit Central (formerly Ski Acres), and Summit East (formerly Hyak and PacWest), border Lake Keechelus on the East and the Alpine Lakes Wilderness on the West/North. The Summit at Snoqualmie is the closest ski area to Seattle, about an hour away.

Ski Lifts, Inc., the operator of what became Summit West, acquired the other three resorts. Booth Creek Ski acquired the properties in 1997. Booth Creek sold The Summit to CNL Lifestyle in 2006, but continued to operate the resort under a lease. Booth Creek sold The Summit lease to Boyne Resorts in 2007. CNL Lifestyle sold Booth Creek in a batch of resorts to Och-Ziff Capital Management in 2016. Boyne purchased the ski resort in March 2018.

Combined, the four base areas have 19 chairlifts and 6 surface lifts. The resort is open seven days and six nights per week.

Alpental

Of the four base areas, only Alpental is located north of I-90 and is known for its advanced and backcountry terrain, including some of the steepest runs in the state. It has 3 double lifts, 1 high-speed detachable-quad, and 1 surface lift.

History 
The territory of Alpental ski area was first owned through mining claims by early prospectors of the valley. Bob Mickelson and some friends bought options on the mining claims around 1960 with plans to develop a ski area on Denny Mountain and a community in the lower area. To help out with their plan, they enlisted Warren Miller to produce a promotional video simply titled "Alpental". To gain access to the area, they had to reach agreement with the Sahalie Ski Club to allow a road through their property. Alpental ski area agreed to maintain this section of road at their cost for the Sahalie group in exchange for this access for 99 years.

The ski area opened for the 1967-68 season with 3 chairlifts, then called Eins (1), Zwei (2), Drei (3), and 5 rope tows, had night skiing from the beginning, and was closed on Mondays. In 1970, the beginner lift, St. Bernard, was installed along with a platter pull that can be accessed via the Drei lift. In 1979, the ski area was sold to Westours (an Alaska tour operator), who gave the lifts real names, Meister (Master), Edelweiss, and Sessel (Chair), and named the rope tows by German numbers, similar to the chairlifts’ old names. Then, in 1984 Westours sold the resort to Ski Lifts, Inc..

In 1984, Debbie Armstrong, a local skier, won the Winter Olympics, which made the summit rename the Meister lift and the Sessel Piste (Chair Slope) Trail into Debbie’s Gold.

Summit West
Summit West contains the most well-known learning terrain of the whole resort. Mainly a beginner/intermediate area, Summit West is home to the Summit Learning Center (SLC), which offers many varieties of lessons for the whole family. It has 2 double lifts, 1 triple lift, 2 quad lifts, and 3 surface lifts.

History
In 1933, the city of Seattle opened a city park called Municipal Park on the location which is now called Summit West.  The city operated this area until 1937, when the townspeople decided Snoqualmie Pass was too far away to be run as a city park.  Operations were turned over to Ski Lifts, Inc. co-owned by Jim Parker and Chauncey Griggs, who had been the concessionaire since 1937, the year they added rope tows to the park. Under the ownership of Ski Lifts, Inc. the area was renamed Snoqualmie Summit Ski Area because of its location at the top of the mountain pass. In 1942, Griggs and Parker sold Ski Lifts, Inc. to Rance Morris and Webb Moffett for $3,500. In 1955, the first double lift at what is now known as the Summit at Snoqualmie, Thunderbird, was installed. In 1963, 1966, and 1967, 3 new lifts were installed: Big Bill, 360, and Dodge Ridge, respectively. In 1969, the Beaver Lake rope tow was replaced with a double lift. In 1973, the last double chair at Snoqualmie Summit, Julie’s Chair, was installed. The first two triple lifts, installed in 1974 and 1975, were Wild Side and Easy Rider. The first quad was installed in 1987, named Little Thunder, replacing three rope tows. Later Snoqualmie Summit was sold to Booth Creek, who renamed it to Summit West, and replaced the aging Big Bill lift with a quad lift called Pacific Crest, and removed the 360 Bowl and Beaver Lake lifts. In 2002, the Thunderbird lift was removed and in 2005, a pole was hauled down to the base. Then the Summit at Snoqualmie was sold to Boyne Mountain, a family owned corporation consisting of nine resorts located in the United States and Canada. In 2018, Boyne removed the Easy Rider chairlift.

Ski Lifts, Inc. acquired Ski Acres in 1980, Alpental in 1983, and Hyak in 1992, agreeing in December 1996 to sell the entire operation to Booth Creek Ski Holdings, Inc.

Summit Central
Summit Central provides a variety of terrain and is typically the most crowded of the slopes. It is also home to a large terrain park which hosts many events throughout the season. It has 3 double lifts, 1 triple lift, 1 quad lift, 2 high-speed detachable-quads, and 2 surface lifts.

History
In 1948, the "Ski Acres" ski area was opened by Ray Tanner. The following year in 1949, the first chairlift in Washington was built. In 1962, a new lift called Alpine was installed by Ray Tanner, servicing the Alpine Bowl, a now popular hill at the resort. In 1966, another lift adjacent to Alpine, called Bonanza, was installed, servicing Golden Nugget, Hog Wild, Outback and Bonanza. In 1967, the Intermediate Chair was installed replacing a Hall T-bar, followed by Condominium (which serviced lower Hog Wild) and then Edelweiss in 1970 and 1972, respectively. In 1975, the Holiday lift was installed running on the north end of Ski Acres. In 1980, Ski Lifts, Inc. acquired Ski Acres and combined the operation with adjacent Snoqualmie Summit. In 1983, the Single Chair, installed in 1949, was replaced with triple lift called Triple 60, and the Edelweiss chair was renamed Easy Street due to a name conflict with the Edelweiss chair of Alpental, and the Intermediate Chair was renamed Gallery. In 1986, new terrain was added on the south end called Silver Fir, and in 1988, a triple chairlift of the same name was installed in the area. After the purchase by Booth Creek in 1997 Ski Acres was renamed Summit Central and the Condominium and chair was renamed Reggie’s. In 1998, a high-speed quad called Central Express replaced the Alpine and Bonanza doubles. In 2008 the Silver Fir triple chair was replaced with a high-speed detachable-quad called Silver Fir Express. In 2019 the Holiday Riblet double chair was replaced with a new Doppelmayr fixed grip quad with a loading carpet. Also in 2019, lighting for Silver Fir Express is installed.

Summit East

Summit East (also known as "Hyak") is the easternmost of the four base areas and is accessible via I-90 exit 54.  A mix of intermediate and advanced runs, Summit East is where to go for glade skiing.  Adjacent to the alpine ski area, the Hyak area has free cross-country skiing on groomed trails along Lake Keechelus on the Iron Horse Trail (maintained by the Washington State Parks). It has 2 triple lifts and 1 quad lift.

History

In 1959, a new ski area was developed on the north side of Hyak Mountain by three businessmen who formed the Hyak Ski Corporation. In 1965, the up-and-over Chair 1 was constructed, and then a beginner Chair 2 in 1968, originally planned to go up "New Cut". Then, the company made some bad financial moves. On December 30, 1971, at approximately 3 p.m., Chair 1 went out of control in reverse, leaving an 18-year-old skier with permanent damage. A backup lift, Chair 3, was installed in 1974. A subsequent lawsuit, along with a bad season sent the area into bankruptcy in 1977.
 
The area was purchased in 1980 by Pac West and expanded terrain to the north in 1986, but they too filed bankruptcy in 1988, when Chair 1 stopped working. Pac West was one of the few ski resorts to allow snowboarding, along with Mt. Baker ski area. Bob Barci helped set up the first snowboard competition in 1985 which was won by Craig Kelly. 
In 1991 the area was purchased by Ski Lifts, Inc who now owned all 4 local Snoqualmie Pass ski areas. The name was then reverted to Hyak and the 3 chairs were given proper names: Chair 1 was Dinosaur, Chair 2 was Easy Gold, and Chair 3 was Keechelus. In 1998, Booth Creek purchased the areas from Ski Lifts, Inc, and Hyak then became Summit East.

On January 7, 2009, a large landslide destroyed the Keechelus ski lift, one house and damaged 3 others, which ended downhill skiing and snowboarding for the rest of the 2008-2009 season and the entire 2009-2010 season. Alpine operations returned for the 2010-2011 season with the installation of the used Silver Fir triple chair from Summit Central on the front side as well as reopening terrain in Hidden Valley re-using a combination of parts from the old Keechelus and Easy Gold double chairs.

On May 15, 2014, The Summit at Snoqualmie announced that the ski resort will start construction of a new chairlift in the spring. Rampart Chair was opened for the 2015/2016 winter season with construction starting in June 2014. The fixed-grip quad chair featuring an easy-load conveyor system was built and installed by SkyTrac, an American chairlift company based in Salt Lake City, Utah. The Rampart chairlift was a long-awaited addition to Summit East and increased uphill capacity substantially while opening up a sizable portion of glade skiing in the area. The chairlift is located on the northern facing slopes of the Summit East ski area.

The new chair was constructed at Summit East in the summer of 2014 and is a fixed-grip quad. It was proposed to open for the 14-15 ski season, but due to lack of snow and storm damage, it was unable to be used. It opened on New Years Day 2016.

In April 2022, The Summit at Snoqualmie released its Summit 2030 Plan, and announced that a triple lift replacing the Hidden Valley double that summer. Hidden Valley opened on Dec 28, 2022.

Cross-Country Skiing 
The Summit at Snoqualmie operates over 50 kilometers of Nordic ski trails. The Nordic center typically operates mid-December to early April. The Nordic center is located at Summit East. Trails feature two warming huts along the trail. The Jim Brooks warming hut is located over Windy Pass (on the west side). There is another hut located at Grand Junction.

In addition to the cross-country ski trails at the Summit at Snoqualmie, there are several miles of cross-country ski trails that are maintained by Washington State Parks and are accessible from the Sno-Park adjacent to the Summit East base area.

Other Activities

Summit Tubing Center
Across from Summit Central is the Summit Tubing Center. With thirteen machine groomed runs it is the largest west of the Mississippi. The runs are approximately five hundred feet long. The Summit Tubing Center was formerly run under the name Snow Flake Tubing Center until its purchase by Booth Creek. The tubing center is serviced by a new magic carpet to replace the two handle-tows (added Summer 2016).

Mountain Bike Park 
In the summer, Silver Fir Express services 7 bike trails: Green Party, Bermy Lomax, Wapiti, Mid-Mountain Connector, Lost and Found, Black Forest, and Slab & Tickle. There is also a trail from Green Party to the Grand Junction warming hut. The park opened in 2022 and the Bermy Lomax trail will be finished by summer 2023. Easier green and blue trails are in the Silver Fir area, and harder black trails are located near Alpine Bowl, Bonanza Face, Golden Nugget, and the Sunrise ski trails in Summit Central.

Scenic Lift Rides 
The Summit at Snoqualmie features scenic lift rides on the Pacific Crest chair not only for scenery, but also for summer hikes on the Pacific Crest Trail. It is used to access Lodge Lake and Beaver Lake and is located on the slopes of Summit West.

Summit 2030 
In April 2022, the Summit at Snoqualmie released the Summit 2030 plan, and is the "Future of Your Home Mountain." They said that between 2022 and 2030, there will be many major improvements, "enhancing the experience from Summit East to the top of Alpental." The plan has 5 major projects: Summit Transformed, Summit Summers, ForeverProject, Alpental Aspect, and Easier Escapes.

Summit Transformed 
Summit Transformed is arguably the largest and most important of the five projects. It includes lift upgrades, more snowmaking, and lodge upgrades.

The Alpental Aspect 
Alpental is best known for it's expert terrain in contrast with intermediate runs under the cliff, but its lifts are aging and capacity is very low.

Summit Summers 
Originally, the Summit at Snoqualmie was a winter resort, but integrated some summer activities like music and scenic lift rides. The Summit continues to plan on opening new summer activities.

Chairlifts

References

Ski areas and resorts in Washington (state)
Cascade Range
Buildings and structures in King County, Washington
Buildings and structures in Kittitas County, Washington
Tourist attractions in King County, Washington
Tourist attractions in Kittitas County, Washington